Hutchison Telecommunications Lanka (Pvt) Ltd, d.b.a. Hutch is a Sri Lankan telecommunication service provider and the country's third largest mobile network operator, with approximately 4 million subscribers of the Sri Lankan mobile market as of June 2022.

Hutch is a subsidiary of CK Hutchison Holdings Limited which owns 85% controlling stake of the company while the rest is held by Emirates Telecommunication Group Company PJSC. Initially it was called as "CallLink" and was the second mobile operator in Sri Lanka. Hutchison acquired its services in 1998 with the aim of being a nationwide operator in Sri Lanka. , Hutch has a network coverage of approximately 90% of the entire island. Hutch announced that they acquired Etisalat on 30-November, 2018.

Hutchison Telecom Lanka is a member of Hutchison Asia Telecom which comprises mobile telecommunications operations in the emerging markets of Indonesia, Vietnam, and Sri Lanka. Hutchison Asia Telecom is a key part of CK Hutchison Holdings which includes the 3 Group comprising 3G operations in Austria, Denmark, Hong Kong, Indonesia] Ireland, Italy, Macau, Sweden. and the UK.

Competition
Hutch Sri Lanka competes with operators like Dialog, SLTMobitel and Airtel.

Technology
Hutch Sri Lanka operates a GSM/EDGE/HSPA+/4G / 5G supported network using 900 / 1800 MHz.
In 2012 the company launched HSPA+ services using 2100 MHz The company testing 5G network and launched 4G via 1800 MHz B3 from 2018 and 900 MHz B8 from 2019. Hutch has  demonstrated fastest 5G experience in Sri Lanka on 17 March 2021 with cooperation of ZTE technologies. Now they are expanding 1800 MHz 4G coverage in rural areas.

References

External links
 Official Website
 Merge  with Etisalat Lanka
 Hutch+Etisalat Combination 

Telecommunications companies of Sri Lanka
Telecommunications companies established in 2004
Organisations based in Colombo
Sri Lankan companies established in 2004